This is a list of the bird species recorded in Bahrain. The avifauna of Bahrain include a total of 357 species, of which 7 have been introduced by humans.

This list's taxonomic treatment (designation and sequence of orders, families and species) and nomenclature (common and scientific names) follow the conventions of The Clements Checklist of Birds of the World, 2022 edition. The family accounts at the beginning of each heading reflect this taxonomy, as do the species counts found in each family account. Introduced and accidental species are included in the total counts for Bahrain.

The following tags have been used to highlight several categories. The commonly occurring native species do not fall into any of these categories.

 (A) Accidental - a species that rarely or accidentally occurs in Bahrain
 (I) Introduced - a species introduced to Bahrain as a consequence, direct or indirect, of human actions
 (Ex) Extirpated - a species that no longer occurs in Bahrain although populations exist elsewhere

Ostriches
Order: StruthioniformesFamily: Struthionidae

The ostrich is a flightless bird native to Africa. It is the largest living species of bird. It is distinctive in its appearance, with a long neck and legs and the ability to run at high speeds.

Common ostrich, Struthio camelus (Ex)

Ducks, geese, and waterfowl
Order: AnseriformesFamily: Anatidae

Anatidae includes the ducks and most duck-like waterfowl, such as geese and swans. These birds are adapted to an aquatic existence with webbed feet, flattened bills, and feathers that are excellent at shedding water due to an oily coating.

Graylag goose, Anser anser
Greater white-fronted goose, Anser albifrons (A)
Mute swan, Cygnus olor (A)
Egyptian goose, Alopochen aegyptiacus (A)
Ruddy shelduck, Tadorna ferruginea (A)
Common shelduck, Tadorna tadorna
Cotton pygmy-goose, Nettapus coromandelianus (A)
Garganey, Spatula querquedula
Northern shoveler, Spatula clypeata
Gadwall, Mareca strepera
Eurasian wigeon, Mareca penelope
Mallard, Anas platyrhynchos
Northern pintail, Anas acuta
Green-winged teal, Anas crecca
Marbled teal, Marmaronetta angustirostris (A)
Red-crested pochard, Netta rufina (A)
Common pochard, Aythya ferina
Ferruginous duck, Aythya nyroca (A)
Tufted duck, Aythya fuligula
Red-breasted merganser, Mergus serrator (A)

Pheasants, grouse, and allies
Order: GalliformesFamily: Phasianidae

The Phasianidae are a family of terrestrial birds which consists of quails, partridges, snowcocks, francolins, spurfowls, tragopans, monals, pheasants, peafowls and jungle fowls. In general, they are plump (although they vary in size) and have broad, relatively short wings.

Common quail, Coturnix coturnix
Chukar, Alectoris chukar
Philby's partridge, Alectoris philbyi
Black francolin, Francolinus francolinus (A)
Gray francolin, Ortygornis pondicerianus

Flamingos
Order: PhoenicopteriformesFamily: Phoenicopteridae

Flamingos filter-feed on shellfish and algae. Their oddly shaped beaks are specially adapted to separate mud and silt from the food they consume and, uniquely, are used upside-down.

Greater flamingo, Phoenicopterus roseus

Grebes
Order: PodicipediformesFamily: Podicipedidae

Grebes are small to medium-large freshwater diving birds. They have lobed toes and are excellent swimmers and divers. However, they have their feet placed far back on the body, making them quite ungainly on land.

Little grebe, Tachybaptus ruficollis
Great crested grebe, Podiceps cristatus
Eared grebe, Podiceps nigricollis

Pigeons and doves
Order: ColumbiformesFamily: Columbidae

Pigeons and doves are stout-bodied birds with short necks and short slender bills with a fleshy cere.

Rock pigeon, Columba livia
Stock dove, Columba oenas (A)
European turtle-dove, Streptopelia turtur
Eurasian collared-dove, Streptopelia decaocto
African collared-dove, Streptopelia roseogrisea (A)
Laughing dove, Streptopelia senegalensis
Namaqua dove, Oena capensis

Sandgrouse
Order: PterocliformesFamily: Pteroclidae

Sandgrouse have small, pigeon like heads and necks, but sturdy compact bodies. They have long pointed wings and sometimes tails and a fast direct flight. Flocks fly to watering holes at dawn and dusk. Their legs are feathered down to the toes.

Pin-tailed sandgrouse, Pterocles alchata
Black-bellied sandgrouse, Pterocles orientalis (A)

Bustards
Order: OtidiformesFamily: Otididae

Bustards are large terrestrial birds mainly associated with dry open country and steppes in the Old World. They are omnivorous and nest on the ground. They walk steadily on strong legs and big toes, pecking for food as they go. They have long broad wings with "fingered" wingtips and striking patterns in flight. Many have interesting mating displays.

Macqueen's bustard, Chlamydotis macqueenii

Cuckoos
Order: CuculiformesFamily: Cuculidae

The family Cuculidae includes cuckoos, roadrunners and anis. These birds are of variable size with slender bodies, long tails and strong legs. The Old World cuckoos are brood parasites.

Great spotted cuckoo, Clamator glandarius (A)
Asian koel, Eudynamys scolopaceus (A)
Common cuckoo, Cuculus canorus

Nightjars and allies
Order: CaprimulgiformesFamily: Caprimulgidae

Nightjars are medium-sized nocturnal birds that usually nest on the ground. They have long wings, short legs and very short bills. Most have small feet, of little use for walking, and long pointed wings. Their soft plumage is camouflaged to resemble bark or leaves.

Eurasian nightjar, Caprimulgus europaeus
Egyptian nightjar, Caprimulgus aegyptius

Swifts
Order: CaprimulgiformesFamily: Apodidae

Swifts are small birds which spend the majority of their lives flying. These birds have very short legs and never settle voluntarily on the ground, perching instead only on vertical surfaces. Many swifts have long swept-back wings which resemble a crescent or boomerang.

Alpine swift, Apus melba
Common swift, Apus apus
Pallid swift, Apus pallidus
Little swift, Apus affinis (A)

Rails, gallinules, and coots
Order: GruiformesFamily: Rallidae

Rallidae is a large family of small to medium-sized birds which includes the rails, crakes, coots and gallinules. Typically they inhabit dense vegetation in damp environments near lakes, swamps or rivers. In general they are shy and secretive birds, making them difficult to observe. Most species have strong legs and long toes which are well adapted to soft uneven surfaces. They tend to have short, rounded wings and to be weak fliers.

Water rail, Rallus aquaticus
Corn crake, Crex crex (A)
Spotted crake, Porzana porzana
Eurasian moorhen, Gallinula chloropus
Eurasian coot, Fulica atra
Gray-headed swamphen, Porphyrio poliocephalus (A)
Little crake, Zapornia parva
Baillon's crake, Zapornia pusilla

Cranes
Order: GruiformesFamily: Gruidae

Cranes are large, long-legged and long-necked birds. Unlike the similar-looking but unrelated herons, cranes fly with necks outstretched, not pulled back. Most have elaborate and noisy courting displays or "dances".

Common crane, Grus grus (A)

Thick-knees
Order: CharadriiformesFamily: Burhinidae

The thick-knees are a group of largely tropical waders in the family Burhinidae. They are found worldwide within the tropical zone, with some species also breeding in temperate Europe and Australia. They are medium to large waders with strong black or yellow-black bills, large yellow eyes and cryptic plumage. Despite being classed as waders, most species have a preference for arid or semi-arid habitats.

Eurasian thick-knee, Burhinus oedicnemus

Stilts and avocets
Order: CharadriiformesFamily: Recurvirostridae

Recurvirostridae is a family of large wading birds, which includes the avocets and stilts. The avocets have long legs and long up-curved bills. The stilts have extremely long legs and long, thin, straight bills. There are 9 species worldwide and 2 species which occur in Bahrain.

Black-winged stilt, Himantopus himantopus
Pied avocet, Recurvirostra avosetta

Oystercatchers
Order: CharadriiformesFamily: Haematopodidae

The oystercatchers are large and noisy plover-like birds, with strong bills used for smashing or prising open molluscs.

Eurasian oystercatcher, Haematopus ostralegus

Plovers and lapwings
Order: CharadriiformesFamily: Charadriidae

The family Charadriidae includes the plovers, dotterels and lapwings. They are small to medium-sized birds with compact bodies, short, thick necks and long, usually pointed, wings. They are found in open country worldwide, mostly in habitats near water.

Black-bellied plover, Pluvialis squatarola
European golden-plover, Pluvialis apricaria (A)
Pacific golden-plover, Pluvialis fulva
Northern lapwing, Vanellus vanellus
Spur-winged plover, Vanellus spinosus (A)
Red-wattled lapwing, Vanellus indicus (A)
Sociable lapwing, Vanellus gregarius (A)
White-tailed lapwing, Vanellus leucurus
Lesser sand-plover, Charadrius mongolus
Greater sand-plover, Charadrius leschenaultii'
Caspian plover, Charadrius asiaticusKittlitz's plover, Charadrius pecuarius (A)
Kentish plover, Charadrius alexandrinusCommon ringed plover, Charadrius hiaticula
Little ringed plover, Charadrius dubius
Eurasian dotterel, Charadrius morinellus (A)

Sandpipers and alliesOrder: CharadriiformesFamily: Scolopacidae

Scolopacidae is a large diverse family of small to medium-sized shorebirds including the sandpipers, curlews, godwits, shanks, tattlers, woodcocks, snipes, dowitchers and phalaropes. The majority of these species eat small invertebrates picked out of the mud or soil. Variation in length of legs and bills enables multiple species to feed in the same habitat, particularly on the coast, without direct competition for food.

Whimbrel, Numenius phaeopus
Eurasian curlew, Numenius arquata
Bar-tailed godwit, Limosa lapponica
Black-tailed godwit, Limosa limosa
Ruddy turnstone, Arenaria interpres
Great knot, Calidris tenuirostris (A)
Red knot, Calidris canutus (A)
Ruff, Calidris pugnax
Broad-billed sandpiper, Calidris falcinellus
Curlew sandpiper, Calidris ferruginea
Temminck's stint, Calidris temminckii
Long-toed stint, Calidris subminuta (A)
Sanderling, Calidris alba
Dunlin, Calidris alpina
Little stint, Calidris minuta
Jack snipe, Lymnocryptes minimus
Eurasian woodcock, Scolopax rusticola (A)
Great snipe, Gallinago media (A)
Common snipe, Gallinago gallinago
Pin-tailed snipe, Gallinago stenura
Terek sandpiper, Xenus cinereus
Red-necked phalarope, Phalaropus lobatus
Common sandpiper, Actitis hypoleucos
Green sandpiper, Tringa ochropus
Spotted redshank, Tringa erythropus
Common greenshank, Tringa nebularia
Marsh sandpiper, Tringa stagnatilis
Wood sandpiper, Tringa glareola
Common redshank, Tringa totanus

Crab ploverOrder: CharadriiformesFamily: Dromadidae

The crab plover is related to the waders. It resembles a plover but with very long grey legs and a strong heavy black bill similar to a tern. It has black-and-white plumage, a long neck, partially webbed feet and a bill designed for eating crabs.

Crab-plover, Dromas ardeola

Pratincoles and coursersOrder: CharadriiformesFamily: Glareolidae

Glareolidae is a family of wading birds comprising the pratincoles, which have short legs, long pointed wings and long forked tails, and the coursers, which have long legs, short wings and long, pointed bills which curve downwards.

Cream-colored courser, Cursorius cursor
Collared pratincole, Glareola pratincola
Black-winged pratincole, Glareola nordmanni (A)
Small pratincole, Glareola lactea (A)

Skuas and jaegersOrder: CharadriiformesFamily: Stercorariidae

The family Stercorariidae are, in general, medium to large birds, typically with grey or brown plumage, often with white markings on the wings. They nest on the ground in temperate and arctic regions and are long-distance migrants.

Pomarine jaeger, Stercorarius pomarinus
Parasitic jaeger, Stercorarius parasiticus (A)

Gulls, terns, and skimmersOrder: CharadriiformesFamily: Laridae

Laridae is a family of medium to large seabirds, the gulls, terns, and skimmers. Gulls are typically grey or white, often with black markings on the head or wings. They have stout, longish bills and webbed feet. Terns are a group of generally medium to large seabirds typically with grey or white plumage, often with black markings on the head. Most terns hunt fish by diving but some pick insects off the surface of fresh water. Terns are generally long-lived birds, with several species known to live in excess of 30 years.

Slender-billed gull, Chroicocephalus genei
Black-headed gull, Chroicocephalus ridibundus
Little gull, Hydrocoloeus minutus (A)
Sooty gull, Ichthyaetus hemprichii (A)
Pallas's gull, Ichthyaetus ichthyaetus
Common gull, Larus canus
Herring gull, Larus argentatus
Caspian gull, Larus cachinnans
Armenian gull, Larus armenicus
Lesser black-backed gull, Larus fuscus
Sooty tern, Onychoprion fuscatus (A)
Bridled tern, Onychoprion anaethetus
Little tern, Sternula albifrons
Saunders's tern, Sternula saundersi
Gull-billed tern, Gelochelidon nilotica
Caspian tern, Hydroprogne caspia
Black tern, Chlidonias niger (A)
White-winged tern, Chlidonias leucopterus
Whiskered tern, Chlidonias hybrida
Roseate tern, Sterna dougallii (A)
Common tern, Sterna hirundo
White-cheeked tern, Sterna repressa
Great crested tern, Thalasseus bergii
Sandwich tern, Thalasseus sandvicensis
Lesser crested tern, Thalasseus bengalensis

TropicbirdsOrder: PhaethontiformesFamily: Phaethontidae

Tropicbirds are slender white birds of tropical oceans, with exceptionally long central tail feathers. Their heads and long wings have black markings.

Red-billed tropicbird, Phaethon aethereus (A)

StorksOrder: CiconiiformesFamily: Ciconiidae

Storks are large, long-legged, long-necked, wading birds with long, stout bills. Storks are mute, but bill-clattering is an important mode of communication at the nest. Their nests can be large and may be reused for many years. Many species are migratory.

Black stork, Ciconia nigra (A)
White stork, Ciconia ciconia

Cormorants and shagsOrder: SuliformesFamily: Phalacrocoracidae

Phalacrocoracidae is a family of medium to large coastal, fish-eating seabirds that includes cormorants and shags. Plumage colouration varies, with the majority having mainly dark plumage, some species being black-and-white and a few being colourful.

Great cormorant, Phalacrocorax carbo
Socotra cormorant, Phalacrocorax nigrogularis

PelicansOrder: PelecaniformesFamily: Pelecanidae

Pelicans are large water birds with a distinctive pouch under their beak. As with other members of the order Pelecaniformes, they have webbed feet with four toes.

Great white pelican, Pelecanus onocrotalus (A)
Dalmatian pelican, Pelecanus crispus (A)

Herons, egrets, and bitternsOrder: PelecaniformesFamily: Ardeidae

The family Ardeidae contains the bitterns, herons and egrets. Herons and egrets are medium to large wading birds with long necks and legs. Bitterns tend to be shorter necked and more wary. Members of Ardeidae fly with their necks retracted, unlike other long-necked birds such as storks, ibises and spoonbills.

Great bittern, Botaurus stellaris
Little bittern, Ixobrychus minutus
Gray heron, Ardea cinerea
Purple heron, Ardea purpurea
Great egret, Ardea alba
Little egret, Egretta garzetta
Western reef-heron, Egretta gularis
Cattle egret, Bubulcus ibis
Squacco heron, Ardeola ralloides
Striated heron, Butorides striata
Black-crowned night-heron, Nycticorax nycticorax

Ibises and spoonbillsOrder: PelecaniformesFamily: Threskiornithidae

Threskiornithidae is a family of large terrestrial and wading birds which includes the ibises and spoonbills. They have long, broad wings with 11 primary and about 20 secondary feathers. They are strong fliers and despite their size and weight, very capable soarers.

Glossy ibis, Plegadis falcinellus
African sacred ibis, Threskiornis aethiopicus
Eurasian spoonbill, Platalea leucorodia

OspreyOrder: AccipitriformesFamily: Pandionidae

The family Pandionidae contains only one species, the osprey. The osprey is a medium-large raptor which is a specialist fish-eater with a worldwide distribution.

Osprey, Pandion haliaetus

Hawks, eagles, and kitesOrder: AccipitriformesFamily: Accipitridae

Accipitridae is a family of birds of prey, which includes hawks, eagles, kites, harriers and Old World vultures. These birds have powerful hooked beaks for tearing flesh from their prey, strong legs, powerful talons and keen eyesight.

Black-winged kite, Elanus caeruleus (A)
Egyptian vulture, Neophron percnopterus
European honey-buzzard, Pernis apivorus
Oriental honey-buzzard, Pernis ptilorhynchus (A)
Short-toed snake-eagle, Circaetus gallicus
Greater spotted eagle, Clanga clanga
Booted eagle, Hieraaetus pennatus
Steppe eagle, Aquila nipalensis
Eurasian marsh-harrier, Circus aeruginosus
Hen harrier, Circus cyaneus (A)
Pallid harrier, Circus macrourus
Montagu's harrier, Circus pygargus (A)
Eurasian sparrowhawk, Accipiter nisus
Black kite, Milvus migrans
Common buzzard, Buteo buteo
Long-legged buzzard, Buteo rufinus

Barn-owlsOrder: StrigiformesFamily: Tytonidae

Barn-owls are medium to large owls with large heads and characteristic heart-shaped faces. They have long strong legs with powerful talons.

Barn owl, Tyto alba

OwlsOrder: StrigiformesFamily: Strigidae

The typical owls are small to large solitary nocturnal birds of prey. They have large forward-facing eyes and ears, a hawk-like beak and a conspicuous circle of feathers around each eye called a facial disk.

Eurasian scops-owl, Otus scops
Pallid scops-owl, Otus brucei (A)
Eurasian eagle-owl, Bubo bubo (A)
Pharaoh eagle-owl, Bubo ascalaphus (A)
Long-eared owl, Asio otus (A)
Short-eared owl, Asio flammeus

HoopoesOrder: BucerotiformesFamily: Upupidae

Hoopoes have black, white and orangey-pink colouring with a large erectile crest on their head.

Eurasian hoopoe, Upupa epops

KingfishersOrder: CoraciiformesFamily: Alcedinidae

Kingfishers are medium-sized birds with large heads, long, pointed bills, short legs and stubby tails.

Common kingfisher, Alcedo atthis
White-throated kingfisher, Halcyon smyrnensis (A)
Pied kingfisher, Ceryle rudis

Bee-eatersOrder: CoraciiformesFamily: Meropidae

The bee-eaters are a group of near passerine birds in the family Meropidae. Most species are found in Africa but others occur in southern Europe, Madagascar, Australia and New Guinea. They are characterised by richly coloured plumage, slender bodies and usually elongated central tail feathers. All are colourful and have long downturned bills and pointed wings, which give them a swallow-like appearance when seen from afar.

Arabian green bee-eater, Merops cyanophrys (A)
Blue-cheeked bee-eater, Merops persicus
European bee-eater, Merops apiaster

RollersOrder: CoraciiformesFamily: Coraciidae

Rollers resemble crows in size and build, but are more closely related to the kingfishers and bee-eaters. They share the colourful appearance of those groups with blues and browns predominating. The two inner front toes are connected, but the outer toe is not.

European roller, Coracias garrulus
Indian roller, Coracias benghalensis (A)

WoodpeckersOrder: PiciformesFamily: Picidae

Woodpeckers are small to medium-sized birds with chisel-like beaks, short legs, stiff tails and long tongues used for capturing insects. Some species have feet with two toes pointing forward and two backward, while several species have only three toes. Many woodpeckers have the habit of tapping noisily on tree trunks with their beaks.

Eurasian wryneck, Jynx torquilla

Falcons and caracarasOrder: FalconiformesFamily: Falconidae

Falconidae is a family of diurnal birds of prey. They differ from hawks, eagles and kites in that they kill with their beaks instead of their talons. T

Lesser kestrel, Falco naumanni
Eurasian kestrel, Falco tinnunculus
Sooty falcon, Falco concolor
Merlin, Falco columbarius (A)
Eurasian hobby, Falco subbuteo
Saker falcon, Falco cherrug
Peregrine falcon, Falco peregrinus

Old World parrotsOrder: PsittaciformesFamily: Psittaculidae

Characteristic features of parrots include a strong curved bill, an upright stance, strong legs, and clawed zygodactyl feet. Many parrots are vividly coloured, and some are multi-coloured. Old World parrots are found from Africa east across south and southeast Asia and Oceania to Australia and New Zealand.

Alexandrine parakeet, Psittacula eupatria
Rose-ringed parakeet, Psittacula krameri (I)

Old World oriolesOrder: PasseriformesFamily: Oriolidae

The Old World orioles are colourful passerine birds. They are not related to the New World orioles.

Eurasian golden oriole, Oriolus oriolus

ShrikesOrder: PasseriformesFamily: Laniidae

Shrikes are passerine birds known for their habit of catching other birds and small animals and impaling the uneaten portions of their bodies on thorns. A typical shrike's beak is hooked, like a bird of prey.

Red-backed shrike, Lanius collurio
Red-tailed shrike, Lanius phoenicuroides
Isabelline shrike, Lanius isabellinus
Bay-backed shrike, Lanius vittatus (A)
Great gray shrike, Lanius excubitor
Lesser gray shrike, Lanius minor
Masked shrike, Lanius nubicus
Woodchat shrike, Lanius senator

Crows, jays, and magpiesOrder: PasseriformesFamily: Corvidae

The family Corvidae includes crows, ravens, jays, choughs, magpies, treepies, nutcrackers and ground jays. Corvids are above average in size among the Passeriformes, and some of the larger species show high levels of intelligence.

House crow, Corvus splendens
Brown-necked raven, Corvus ruficollis (Ex) (A)

Penduline-titsOrder: PasseriformesFamily: Remizidae

The penduline-tits are a group of small passerine birds related to the true tits. They are insectivores.

Eurasian penduline-tit, Remiz pendulinus (A)

LarksOrder: PasseriformesFamily: Alaudidae

Larks are small terrestrial birds with often extravagant songs and display flights. Most larks are fairly dull in appearance. Their food is insects and seeds.

Greater hoopoe-lark, Alaemon alaudipes
Thick-billed lark, Ramphocoris clotbey
Bar-tailed lark, Ammomanes cincturus
Desert lark, Ammomanes deserti
Black-crowned sparrow-lark, Eremopterix nigriceps
Greater short-toed lark, Calandrella brachydactyla
Bimaculated lark, Melanocorypha bimaculata
Calandra lark, Melanocorypha calandra (A)
Mediterranean short-toed lark, Alaudala rufescens
Turkestan short-toed lark, Alaudala heinei
Wood lark, Lullula arborea (A)
Eurasian skylark, Alauda arvensis
Oriental skylark, Alauda gulgula
Crested lark, Galerida cristata

Cisticolas and alliesOrder: PasseriformesFamily: Cisticolidae

The Cisticolidae are warblers found mainly in warmer southern regions of the Old World. They are generally very small birds of drab brown or grey appearance found in open country such as grassland or scrub.

Graceful prinia, Prinia gracilis
Delicate prinia, Prinia lepida

Reed warblers and alliesOrder: PasseriformesFamily: Acrocephalidae

The members of this family are usually rather large for "warblers". Most are rather plain olivaceous brown above with much yellow to beige below. They are usually found in open woodland, reedbeds, or tall grass. The family occurs mostly in southern to western Eurasia and surroundings, but it also ranges far into the Pacific, with some species in Africa.

Eastern olivaceous warbler, Iduna pallida
Upcher's warbler, Hippolais languida
Icterine warbler, Hippolais icterina (A)
Moustached warbler, Acrocephalus melanopogon (A)
Sedge warbler, Acrocephalus schoenobaenus
Paddyfield warbler, Acrocephalus agricola (A)
Blyth's reed warbler, Acrocephalus dumetorum (A)
Marsh warbler, Acrocephalus palustris
Eurasian reed warbler, Acrocephalus scirpaceus
Basra reed warbler, Acrocephalus griseldis (A)
Great reed warbler, Acrocephalus arundinaceus
Clamorous reed warbler, Acrocephalus stentoreus

Grassbirds and alliesOrder: PasseriformesFamily: Locustellidae

Locustellidae are a family of small insectivorous songbirds found mainly in Eurasia, Africa, and the Australian region. They are smallish birds with tails that are usually long and pointed, and tend to be drab brownish or buffy all over.

River warbler, Locustella fluviatilis (A)
Savi's warbler, Locustella luscinioides (A)
Common grasshopper-warbler, Locustella naevia

SwallowsOrder: PasseriformesFamily: Hirundinidae

The family Hirundinidae is adapted to aerial feeding. They have a slender streamlined body, long pointed wings and a short bill with a wide gape. The feet are adapted to perching rather than walking, and the front toes are partially joined at the base.

Bank swallow, Riparia riparia
Eurasian crag-martin, Ptyonoprogne rupestris
Barn swallow, Hirundo rustica
Red-rumped swallow, Cecropis daurica
Common house-martin, Delichon urbicum

BulbulsOrder: PasseriformesFamily: Pycnonotidae

Bulbuls are medium-sized songbirds. Some are colourful with yellow, red or orange vents, cheeks, throats or supercilia, but most are drab, with uniform olive-brown to black plumage. Some species have distinct crests.

Red-vented bulbul, Pycnonotus cafer (I)
White-eared bulbul, Pycnonotus leucotis

Leaf warblersOrder: PasseriformesFamily: Phylloscopidae

Leaf warblers are a family of small insectivorous birds found mostly in Eurasia and ranging into Wallacea and Africa. The species are of various sizes, often green-plumaged above and yellow below, or more subdued with greyish-green to greyish-brown colours.

Wood warbler, Phylloscopus sibilatrix
Yellow-browed warbler, Phylloscopus inornatus (A)
Hume's warbler, Phylloscopus humei (A)
Plain leaf warbler, Phylloscopus neglectus (A)
Willow warbler, Phylloscopus trochilus
Common chiffchaff, Phylloscopus collybita
Green warbler, Phylloscopus nitidus (A)
Greenish warbler, Phylloscopus trochiloides (A)

Sylviid warblers, parrotbills, and alliesOrder: PasseriformesFamily: Sylviidae

The family Sylviidae is a group of small insectivorous passerine birds. They mainly occur as breeding species, as the common name implies, in Europe, Asia and, to a lesser extent, Africa. Most are of generally undistinguished appearance, but many have distinctive songs.

Eurasian blackcap, Sylvia atricapilla
Garden warbler, Sylvia borin
Asian desert warbler, Curruca nana
Barred warbler, Curruca nisoria
Lesser whitethroat, Curruca curruca
Eastern Orphean warbler, Curruca crassirostris
Menetries's warbler, Curruca mystacea
Greater whitethroat, Curruca communis

StarlingsOrder: PasseriformesFamily: Sturnidae

Starlings are small to medium-sized passerine birds. Their flight is strong and direct and they are very gregarious. Their preferred habitat is fairly open country. They eat insects and fruit. Plumage is typically dark with a metallic sheen.

European starling, Sturnus vulgaris
Wattled starling, Creatophora cinerea (A)
Rosy starling, Pastor roseus
Common myna, Acridotheres tristis

Thrushes and alliesOrder: PasseriformesFamily: Turdidae

The thrushes are a group of passerine birds that occur mainly in the Old World. They are plump, soft plumaged, small to medium-sized insectivores or sometimes omnivores, often feeding on the ground. Many have attractive songs.

Mistle thrush, Turdus viscivorus (A)
Song thrush, Turdus philomelos
Redwing, Turdus iliacus (A)
Eurasian blackbird, Turdus merula (A)
Eyebrowed thrush, Turdus obscurus (A)
Fieldfare, Turdus pilaris (A)
Ring ouzel, Turdus torquatus (A)
Black-throated thrush, Turdus atrogularis (A)

Old World flycatchersOrder: PasseriformesFamily: Muscicapidae

Old World flycatchers are a large group of small passerine birds native to the Old World. They are mainly small arboreal insectivores. The appearance of these birds is highly varied, but they mostly have weak songs and harsh calls.

Spotted flycatcher, Muscicapa striata
Black scrub-robin, Cercotrichas podobe (A)
Rufous-tailed scrub-robin, Cercotrichas galactotes
European robin, Erithacus rubecula
White-throated robin, Irania gutturalis
Thrush nightingale, Luscinia luscinia
Common nightingale, Luscinia megarhynchos
Bluethroat, Luscinia svecica
Red-breasted flycatcher, Ficedula parva
Semicollared flycatcher, Ficedula semitorquata
Collared flycatcher, Ficedula albicollis (A)
Rufous-backed redstart, Phoenicurus erythronota (A)
Common redstart, Phoenicurus phoenicurus
Black redstart, Phoenicurus ochruros
Rufous-tailed rock-thrush, Monticola saxatilis
Blue rock-thrush, Monticola solitarius
Whinchat, Saxicola rubetra
European stonechat, Saxicola rubicolus
Siberian stonechat, Saxicola maurus
Northern wheatear, Oenanthe oenanthe
Isabelline wheatear, Oenanthe isabellina
Hooded wheatear, Oenanthe monacha (A)
Desert wheatear, Oenanthe deserti
Pied wheatear, Oenanthe pleschanka
Western black-eared wheatear, Oenanthe hispanica
Eastern black-eared wheatear, Oenanthe melanoleuca
Hume's wheatear, Oenanthe alboniger (A)
White-crowned wheatear, Oenanthe leucopyga (A)
Finsch's wheatear, Oenanthe finschii (A)
Mourning wheatear, Oenanthe lugens
Kurdish wheatear, Oenanthe xanthoprymna
Persian wheatear, Oenanthe chrysopygia

HypocoliusOrder: PasseriformesFamily: Hypocoliidae

The grey hypocolius is a small Middle Eastern bird with the shape and soft plumage of a waxwing. They are mainly a uniform grey colour except the males have a black triangular mask around their eyes.

Hypocolius, Hypocolius ampelinus

Sunbirds and spiderhuntersOrder: PasseriformesFamily: Nectariniidae

The sunbirds and spiderhunters are very small passerine birds which feed largely on nectar, although they will also take insects, especially when feeding young. Flight is fast and direct on their short wings. Most species can take nectar by hovering like a hummingbird, but usually perch to feed.

Purple sunbird, Cinnyris asiaticus

Weavers and alliesOrder: PasseriformesFamily: Ploceidae

The weavers are small passerine birds related to the finches. They are seed-eating birds with rounded conical bills. The males of many species are brightly coloured, usually in red or yellow and black, some species show variation in colour only in the breeding season.

Rüppell's weaver, Ploceus galbula (I)
Streaked weaver, Ploceus manyar (I)
Red fody, Foudia madagascariensis (I)
Southern red bishop, Euplectes orix (I)
Yellow-crowned bishop, Euplectes afer (I)

Waxbills and alliesOrder: PasseriformesFamily: Estrildidae

The estrildid finches are small passerine birds of the Old World tropics and Australasia. They are gregarious and often colonial seed eaters with short thick but pointed bills. They are all similar in structure and habits, but have wide variation in plumage colours and patterns.

Red avadavat, Amandava amandava (I)
Indian silverbill, Euodice malabarica
African silverbill, Euodice cantans

Old World sparrowsOrder: PasseriformesFamily: Passeridae

Old World sparrows are small passerine birds. In general, sparrows tend to be small, plump, brown or grey birds with short tails and short powerful beaks. Sparrows are seed eaters, but they also consume small insects.

House sparrow, Passer domesticus
Spanish sparrow, Passer hispaniolensis (A)
Dead Sea sparrow, Passer moabiticus (A)
Yellow-throated sparrow, Gymnoris xanthocollis (A)
Pale rockfinch, Carpospiza brachydactyla

Wagtails and pipitsOrder: PasseriformesFamily: Motacillidae

Motacillidae is a family of small passerine birds with medium to long tails. They include the wagtails, longclaws and pipits. They are slender, ground feeding insectivores of open country.

Gray wagtail, Motacilla cinerea
Western yellow wagtail, Motacilla flava
Citrine wagtail, Motacilla citreola
White wagtail, Motacilla alba
Richard's pipit, Anthus richardi
Blyth's pipit, Anthus godlewskii (A)
Tawny pipit, Anthus campestris
Meadow pipit, Anthus pratensis
Tree pipit, Anthus trivialis
Olive-backed pipit, Anthus hodgsoni (A)
Red-throated pipit, Anthus cervinus
Water pipit, Anthus spinoletta
American pipit, Anthus rubescens (A)

Finches, euphonias, and alliesOrder: PasseriformesFamily: Fringillidae

Finches are seed-eating passerine birds, that are small to moderately large and have a strong beak, usually conical and in some species very large. All have twelve tail feathers and nine primaries. These birds have a bouncing flight with alternating bouts of flapping and gliding on closed wings, and most sing well.

Common chaffinch, Fringilla coelebs (A)
Brambling, Fringilla montifringilla (A)
Common rosefinch, Carpodacus erythrinus (A)
Trumpeter finch, Bucanetes githaginea
Mongolian finch, Bucanetes mongolicus (A)
Eurasian linnet, Linaria cannabina (A)
European goldfinch, Carduelis carduelis (A)
Eurasian siskin, Spinus spinus

Old World buntingsOrder: PasseriformesFamily': Emberizidae

The emberizids are a large family of passerine birds. They are seed-eating birds with distinctively shaped bills. Many emberizid species have distinctive head patterns.

Black-headed bunting, Emberiza melanocephala (A)
Corn bunting, Emberiza calandraYellowhammer, Emberiza citrinella (A)
Cinereous bunting, Emberiza cineracea (A)
Ortolan bunting, Emberiza hortulanaReed bunting, Emberiza schoeniclus (A)
Yellow-breasted bunting, Emberiza aureola'' (A)

See also
List of birds
Lists of birds by region

Notes

References

Lists of birds by country
Lists of birds of Asia
Lists of birds of the Middle East
birds

birds